Charles C. Mann (born 1955) is an American journalist and author, specializing in scientific topics. In 2006 his book 1491: New Revelations of the Americas Before Columbus won the National Academies Communication Award for best book of the year. He is the coauthor of four books, and contributing editor for Science, The Atlantic Monthly, and Wired.

Biography
Mann was born in 1955 and graduated from Amherst College in 1976. 
Mann has written for Fortune, The New York Times, Smithsonian, Technology Review, Vanity Fair, and The Washington Post. In 2005 he wrote 1491: New Revelations of the Americas Before Columbus, followed in 2011 by 1493: Uncovering the New World Columbus Created. He served as a judge for the PEN/E. O. Wilson Literary Science Writing Award in 2012. He has also written for the TV series Law & Order.

He is a three-time National Magazine Award finalist and a recipient of writing awards from the American Bar Association, the American Institute of Physics, the Alfred P. Sloan Foundation, and the Lannan Foundation. He lives in Amherst, Massachusetts with his wife and children.

In 2018, Mann published The Wizard and the Prophet, which details two competing theories about the future of agriculture, population, and the environment. The titular "wizard" Mann refers to is Norman Borlaug, the Nobel Peace Prize winner credited with developing the Green Revolution and saving one billion people from starvation. Mann refers to William Vogt, an early proponent of population control, as the "prophet".

Bibliography

Books written or co-written by Mann

 (with Robert P. Crease) The Second Creation: Makers of the Revolution in Twentieth-Century Physics, 1st ed., New York: Macmillan, 1986; rev. ed., New Brunswick, NJ:Rutgers University Press, 1996
 (with Mark L. Plummer) The Aspirin Wars: Money, Medicine, and 100 Years of Rampant Competition, New York: Alfred A. Knopf, 1991
 (With Mark L. Plummer) Noah’s Choice: The Future of Endangered Species, 1995
 (With David H. Freedman) @ Large: The Strange Case of the World's Biggest Internet Invasion, 1997
 1491: New Revelations of the Americas Before Columbus, New York: Alfred A. Knopf, 2005
 1493: Uncovering the New World Columbus Created, Knopf, 2011
 1493 for Young People: From Columbus's Voyage to Globalization, Seven Stories Press, 2015.

Selected articles by Mann
 "Our Good Earth: The Future Rests on the Soil Beneath Our Feet; Can We Save It?", National Geographic, September 2008, pp. 80–107.
 "The Birth of Religion", National Geographic, June 2011, pp. 34–59.
 "State of the Species: Does Success Spell Doom for Homo sapiens?", Orion, November/December 2012.

Reviews of books by Mann
 
  Review of 1491 and 1493.

References

External links
 "An interview with Charles C. Mann" at BookBrowse
 

1955 births
20th-century American journalists
American male journalists
American non-fiction environmental writers
The Atlantic (magazine) people
Living people
Writers about globalization